Kadavulailai (also known as Bounty Island) is a small, private island within the Mamanuca Islands of Fiji in the South Pacific. The islands are a part of the Fiji's Western Division.

Geography
Kadavulailai is a low reef island. It s home to a private resort. There are lots of sandy beaches on one side, with more rocky exposed beaches on the other.

References

External links
Bounty Island

Islands of Fiji
Mamanuca Islands